Vimic is an American heavy metal band consisting of Jed Simon, Kyle Konkiel, Matthew Tarach, Kalen Chase, and Steve Marshall.

History
After Joey Jordison left Slipknot in late 2013, he began focusing on other projects. One of these, Scar the Martyr, had released a self-titled album before disbanding, and some its members formed a new band, which they named Vimic. The group's original lineup consisted of Jordison on drums, Kalen Chase on vocals, Jed Simon and Kris Norris on guitar, Kyle Konkiel on bass, and Matthew Tarach on keyboards. Vimic unveiled their first single, "Simple Skeletons", on May 6, 2016. On May 16, they released a music video for another song, "She Sees Everything".  On June 3, they released a third song and music video, "My Fate". The band began touring as a five-piece, as Kris Norris departed the band shortly after the release of "Simple Skeletons". Later that year, they announced Steve Marshall as their new second guitarist.

Vimic's debut album, Open Your Omen, was scheduled to be released in 2019. In mid-2017, images surfaced of Megadeth frontman Dave Mustaine working in the studio with Jordison, fueling speculation that he was somehow involved with the album's recording. In October 2017, it was revealed that Mustaine would be featured on the song "Fail Me (My Temple)", which was issued along with the announcement that Open Your Omen would now be released via UMe/T-Boy Records on an as-yet-unconfirmed date in 2019. In the announcement, it was also confirmed that the album was produced by Jordison and Kato Khandwala, with mixing and mastering partially overseen by Mustaine.

However, activity ground to a halt in 2018. Khandwala died on April 25, 2018, in a motorcycle accident, and Jordison, Konkiel, and Simon had turned their attention to Sinsaenum, Bad Wolves, and Imonolith, respectively. Jordison died on July 26, 2021.

Band members
Current
 Jed Simon – guitars, backing vocals (2015–present)
 Kyle Konkiel – bass, backing vocals (2015–present)
 Matthew Tarach – keyboards, backing vocals (2015–present)
 Kalen Chase – lead vocals (2015–present)
 Steve Marshall – guitars, backing vocals (2016–present)

Former
 Kris Norris – guitars, backing vocals (2015–2016)
 Joey Jordison – drums (2015–2021; died 2021)

Discography
Singles
 "Simple Skeletons" (2016)
 "She Sees Everything" (2016)
 "My Fate" (2016)
 "Fail Me (My Temple)" (2017)

References

American industrial metal musical groups
American nu metal musical groups
Musical groups established in 2016
American groove metal musical groups
American alternative metal musical groups
2016 establishments in the United States